USS Mountrail (APA/LPA-213) was a  of the US Navy in World War II, the Korean War and Vietnam War era. She was of the VC2-S-AP5 Victory ship design type. Mountrail was named for Mountrail County, North Dakota.

Construction
Mountrail was laid down 24 June 1944, under Maritime Commission (MARCOM) contract , MCV hull 561, by Permanente Metals Corporation, Yard No. 2, Richmond, California; launched 20 September 1944; sponsored by Mrs. Margaret H. Marshall; and commissioned 16 November 1944.

Service history

World War II
Following shakedown, Mountrail embarked troops at Seattle and sailed for the Philippines 10 January 1945.

Invasion of Okinawa

Reaching Leyte Gulf 21 February, she put to sea with men of the 77th Infantry Division for amphibious training off Leyte before departing San Pedro Bay 21 March to join a convoy for the Okinawa invasion. She arrived off Kerama Retto 26 March. While she landed troops 2 April, her gunners shot down three planes.

Transport duties
Mountrail departed Kerama Retto and arrived San Francisco 22 May, to load troops for the Philippines, whom she disembarked at Manila. Returning San Francisco 5 August, she sailed with more troops, landing them at Batangas, Luzon, 11 September. At Leyte Gulf she took on occupation troops whom she landed at Hakodate, Japan, 4 October. then carried Marines from Japan to Tsingtao, China, before sailing for home 5 November.

First decommissioning
She decommissioned 12 July 1946, and entered the Pacific Reserve Fleet at Stockton, California.

Korean War
With the outbreak of the Korean War, Mountrail recommissioned 9 September 1950, and sailed 22 December, for the Far East to carry men between Japan and Korea until returning San Diego 2 August 1951. On 28 May 1952, she sailed for her second tour of duty with the 7th Fleet operating between Hong Kong and Korea for the next 6 months. On 14 October 1952, she joined in the feint off Kojo, Korea, which tricked the Communists completely.

Operation "Passage to Freedom"
Mountrail returned to Long Beach in December and trained on the West Coast until sailing for Japan 28 November 1953. She sailed between the Philippines and Japan until August. when she Joined Operation Passage to Freedom, the massive evacuation of refugees from North to South Vietnam.

Second decommissioning
She returned to Pacific Reserve Fleet, Long Beach 9 October 1954, and decommissioned 1 October 1955, to return to the Pacific Reserve Fleet, and later transferred to the National Defense Reserve Fleet, Suisun Bay, California, 7 June 1960.

Third commission

Mountrail recommissioned 22 November 1961, and sailed to join Amphibious Squadron 12, US Atlantic Fleet. During training, she operated in the Atlantic and Caribbean, strengthening American forces at Guantánamo Bay during the Cuban Missile Crisis of fall 1962. In October and November 1964 she took part in NATO landing exercises in southern Spain, and 8 February 1965, she left Norfolk, Virginia for her first deployment with the 6th Fleet. She took part in exercises off Norway in June and July, returning Norfolk 20 July.

Into 1969, Mountrail had continued annual deployments with the 6th Fleet, strengthening the amphibious capability of this bulwark of freedom in the Mediterranean.

Final decommissioning
She was decommissioned 13 August 1970, with delivery to the Maritime Administration (MARAD) the same day. Mountrail was laid up in the National Defense Reserve Fleet, James River Group, Lee Hall, Virginia. She was struck from the Navy Vessel Register on 1 December 1976. On 19 September 1984, she was withdrawn from the fleet for stripping, being returned 14 August 1985.

She was immediately resold to Rivson International, Inc. On 15 March 1990, she was again sold by Bomar Resources, formerly Rivson Int., Inc., to Eckhardt Marine, Gmbh, for scrapping in India or Bangladesh. She was withdrawn from the fleet 1 June 1990, with scrapping in India final 21 May 1991.

Awards
Mountrail received one battle star for World War II service and three for Korean War service.

Notes 

Citations

Bibliography 

Online resources

External links

 

Haskell-class attack transports
Mountrail County, North Dakota
World War II amphibious warfare vessels of the United States
Troop ships
Ships built in Richmond, California
1944 ships
Pacific Reserve Fleet, Stockton Group
Pacific Reserve Fleet, Long Beach Group
Suisun Bay Reserve Fleet
James River Reserve Fleet